Emily Hayden is a former camogie player, captain of the All Ireland Camogie Championship winning team in 2001.

Career
She played in six successive All Ireland finals for Tipperary winning All Ireland medals in 1999, 2000, 2001, 2002, 2003 and 2004. She won her first All Ireland senior club medal with Cashel in 2007  and a second against Athenry in 2009. She was nominated for an All Star award in 2006.

References

External links
 Camogie.ie Official Camogie Association Website
 Wikipedia List of Camogie players

Tipperary camogie players
Living people
Year of birth missing (living people)